Quotations from Chairman Mao Tse-tung is a book of statements from speeches and writings by Mao Zedong (formerly romanized as Mao Tse-tung), the former Chairman of the Chinese Communist Party, published from 1964 to about 1976 and widely distributed during the Cultural Revolution.

The most popular versions were printed in small sizes that could be easily carried and were bound in bright red covers, thus commonly becoming known internationally as the "Little Red Book".

Publication process 
Quotations from Chairman Mao Tse-tung was originally compiled by an office of the PLA Daily (People's Liberation Army Daily) as an inspirational political and military document. The initial publication covered 23 topics with 200 selected quotations by the Chairman of the Chinese Communist Party, and was entitled 200 Quotations from Chairman Mao. It was first given to delegates of a conference on 5 January 1964 who were asked to comment on it. In response to the views of the deputies and compilers of the book, the work was expanded to address 25 topics with 267 quotations, and the title was changed simply to Quotations from Chairman Mao Tse-Tung.

On 10 January, the work was re-issued to the delegates and sent to select units of the People's Liberation Army who received their advance copies for educating troops as well as for their comments. In May 1964, the PLA General Political Department, the chief political organ under Central Military Commission, revised Quotations, adding a half title page with the slogan "Workers of the world, unite!" in bold red letters, and endorsement leaves written by Lin Biao, Mao's chosen successor, that included three lines from the diary of revolutionary soldier Lei Feng who is considered a hero in China. This version was issued "for internal use" to the military leaders. Following discussions that expanded the book twice more—finally closing on 33 topics and 427 quotations by Mao—the commission began publishing the definitive version in May 1965.
At the end of 1965, the Central Committee of the Chinese Communist Party officially approved the book for publication by the People's Publishing House and for distribution within China by the Xinhua Bookstore.

The Ministry of Culture held special study meetings to develop a production and distribution plan. It sought assurances that the book would receive publishing priority and that there would be sufficient paper, ink, and printing presses available. The goal was for "ninety-nine percent (of the population of China to) read Chairman Mao's book", according to a catalogue of publication records of the People's Publishing House. Provinces, municipalities, and autonomous regions across China were ordered to build hundreds of new printing houses to publish the Quotations during the second half of 1966 which pushed the limits of the Chinese printing industry.

This disrupted plans for publishing any new volumes of The Complete Works of Marx and Engels that was already in progress. It also halted distribution of other ideological works. As late as 1970, more than 8 million copies of the 4-volume set of Selected Works of Marx and Engels that had already been printed (both in cloth hardcover and paperback) remained undistributed in storage warehouses on the grounds that other works "should not interfere with learning Quotations from Chairman Mao Tse-Tung".

On the other hand, several other works by Mao had very large printings during the same period, even though these editions were not produced in the huge numbers of Quotations from Chairman Mao. These include Selected Works of Mao Zedong (in four volumes, 2.875 million copies in 14 languages), Selected Articles of Mao Zedong (various editions totalling 252 million copies), single article books, and works of poetry.

Foreign distribution 

In 1966, the Publicity Department of the Chinese Communist Party approved Quotations from Chairman Mao for export. To meet overseas requirements, the editors of the Chinese Foreign Languages Press made revisions necessitated by the situation. They added a "second edition preface" endorsement by Lin Biao, dated 16 December 1966 (which was torn out following Lin Biao's death and public disgrace in September 1971). On the last page, they listed the names of the publisher (PLA General Political Department) without an ISBN, the printer and distributor (both Xinhua Bookstore), and the publication year.

By May 1967, bookstores in 117 countries and territories around the world – including the United Kingdom, France, Spain, Japan, the Soviet Union, Germany, Italy, Nepal, Indonesia, Philippines, Burma, Iran, various Arab and African nations and others – were distributing Mao's Quotations. Foreign presses operating in 20 countries contributed to the publication of 20 translations in 35 versions.

Publication number 
The Little Red Book has produced a wide array of sales and distribution figures. Some sources claim that over 6.5 billion printed volumes have been distributed in total, others contend that the distribution ran into the "billions", and others cite "over a billion" official volumes between 1966 and 1969 alone as well as "untold numbers of unofficial local reprints and unofficial translations."

The book's popularity may be because it was essentially an unofficial requirement for every Chinese citizen to own, to read, and to carry it at all times during the latter half of Mao's rule, especially during the Cultural Revolution.

Formats 
The most widely produced editions of the Quotations of Chairman Mao were published with a printed red vinyl cover wrapper over cardboard with pages bound in 64 folios that included photos of Mao. Other editions of the book were covered in cloth, silk, leather, paper, and other materials.

Most editions were produced in a functional, compact size that fit into a pocket, were easy to carry, and could be taken out at any time "for practice, learning, application." It was published in 32 other common sizes, allegedly the largest format printed on only 4 pages as large as the newspaper Reference News, and the smallest format the size of a matchbox.

Role and social impact 

Today in China, the book is a symbol of Mao Zedong Thought. In certain situations, the Quotations is given as a gift, for example, when public funds are involved, or when personal events arise, such as congratulating newlyweds, and so on.

Foreign press report called the work "The Little Red Book", reflecting its common small size and bright cover. After the Cultural Revolution ended, some Chinese people also adopted the nickname (back-translated into Chinese as "The Treasured Red Book") .

During the 1960s, the book was the single most visible icon in mainland China, even more visible than the image of the Chairman himself. In posters and pictures created by CCP's propaganda artists, nearly every painted character, whether smiling or looking determined, was seen with a copy of the book in his or her hand. After the end of the Cultural Revolution in 1976 and the rise of Deng Xiaoping in 1978, the importance of the book waned considerably, and the glorification of Mao's quotations was considered to be left deviationism and a cult of personality.

Today in China, the book Quotations from Chairman Mao Tse-Tung is mostly seen by the Chinese people as a piece of nostalgia. Various editions are popular with some collectors, and rare and unusual printings command extremely high prices. It may be purchased at shops in Beijing, Shanghai, other major cities in China, as well as at some tourist attractions. The edition currently (2012) available (photo above) has a publication date of 1966. It has about thirty colour photographs at the front. There are then another 378 pages with Traditional Chinese on the left pages and the English translation on the right pages. The English language edition has many spelling mistakes as well as other typographical errors on almost every page. Only the first 22 chapters are in this edition compared with 33 in the first Chinese and English editions. There is no Lin Biao page.

The Chinese social network Xiaohongshu, literally "Little Red Book", is named after the book.

Synopsis 

Quotations from Chairman Mao Tse-Tung consists of 427 quotations, organized thematically into 33 chapters. It is also called "Thoughts of Chairman Mao" by many Chinese people. The quotations range in length from a sentence to a few short paragraphs, and borrow heavily from a group of about two dozen documents in the four volumes of Mao's Selected Works.

Usually the quotations are arranged logically, to deal with one to three themes in the development of a chapter. The table below summarizes the book.

See also 
Chairman Mao badge
Communist propaganda
 General Secretary Xi Jinping important speech series
 History of the Communist Party of the Soviet Union (Bolsheviks)
Indoctrination
 Mao Zedong's cult of personality
 Political power grows out of the barrel of a gun
 Political religion
 Xuexi Qiangguo
 Ruhnama
 The Governance of China
 The Green Book
Red Guards
Secular religion
The Little Red Schoolbook

References

Further reading 
 Bristow, Michael (2007). "Who Owns Mao's Millions?" BBC News.
 Cook, Alexander C., ed. (2014). Mao's Little Red Book: A Global History. Cambridge University Press.
 DeFrancis, John (1975). Annotated Quotations from Chairman Mao. Yale University Press. .
 Han, Oliver Lei. Sources and Early Printing History of Chairman Mao's "Quotations".

External links

English translations of original text 
 Quotations from Chairman Mao Tse-Tung, Terebess Asia Online (TAO)
 Quotations from Chairman Mao Tse-Tung, Art-bin.com
 Quotations from Mao Tse-Tung, Mao Tse Tung Internet Archive, Marxists.org

1964 non-fiction books
Books of quotations
Chinese culture
Chinese literature
Mao Tse-Tung, Quotations from Chairman
Cultural Revolution
Ideology of the Chinese Communist Party
Maoist China propaganda
Maoist terminology
People's Republic of China culture
Propaganda books and pamphlets
Propaganda in China
Works by Mao Zedong